Loftis is a surname. Notable people with the surname include:

Curtis M. Loftis, Jr. (born 1958), American politician, businessman and philanthropist
Dwight Loftis (born 1943), American politician
Norman Loftis, American poet
Robert Geers Loftis (born 1956), American diplomat
Zenas Sanford Loftis (1881–1909), American missionary to Tibet